Junior, the fifth full length album by American guitarist Kaki King, was released April 13, 2010.

Track listing

Critical reception

Writing for Allmusic, music critic Thom Jurek wrote "The mood of the recording is dark, even angry, though there are certain themes of political intrigue amid personal turmoil... The biggest drawback, one that can make the listener tire of the album long before it ends, is her terminally flat, undisciplined voice. More often than not, her compelling song structures suffer because of it." BLARE Magazine called it "everything her admirers... revel in, but cocooned in an indie rock shell that’s rigid on the outside with a tender core. Both her words and guitar licks are poetic and spiteful, as they portray King’s instrumental ability to produce guitar melodies that tease, anger and even drug, a trait some modern guitarists in this lifetime severely lack." Jessica Hopper of Spin wrote, "King sounds wholly at home commanding an indie-rock power trio. Junior could be just the thing for still-mourning Sleater-Kinney fans or anyone who likes their licks righteous and their indignation more so."

Personnel
Kaki King – guitars, vocals
Jordan Perlson – drums
Dan Brantigan – multiple instruments
Matt Hankle - drums on Falling Day

Production
Malcolm Burn – producer

References

Kaki King albums
2010 albums
Albums produced by Malcolm Burn